"Walk a Mile in My Shoes" is a song written by Joe South, who had a hit with it in 1970. South was also producer and arranger of the track and of its B-side, "Shelter." The single was credited to "Joe South and the Believers"; the Believers included his brother Tommy South and his sister-in-law Barbara South.

The song's highest position on the Billboard Hot 100 was #12, which was also its highest position in the Cashbox chart. It also reached highs of #56 country and #3 Adult Contemporary in Billboard, and it made #10 in the RPM chart in Canada. It was South's second and final record to reach the top 20 of the Billboard chart. It also reached the Top 20 in Australia.

Background
The song concerns racial tolerance and the need for perspective and compassion.

Chart history

Weekly charts

Year-end charts

Notable covers and references
Elvis Presley, on his 1970 live album On Stage
 Willie Hightower, as a single in 1970 (also included on the Honest Jon's 2004 compilation album simply titled Willie Hightower), originally produced by Rick Hall at FAME Studios in Muscle Shoals, Alabama
Harry Belafonte and Lena Horne as part of an hour-long television special
Cliff Waldron, on his 1970 bluegrass album Right On
Bob Andy, in a 1970 reggae cover
Billy Eckstine, on his 1971 album Feel the Warm
Marion Montgomery, on her 1972 album Marion in the Morning
Jerry Lee Lewis, on his 1972 album The Killer Rocks On
People's Temple Choir, on their 1973 album He's Able
Bryan Ferry, on his 1974 album Another Time, Another Place
De Dijk, on their 2002 album Muzikanten dansen niet (Dutch version of the song)
Greg Page, included in his 2004 Nashville concert
Coldcut, on their 2006 album Sound Mirrors, featuring vocals from Robert Owens
Otis Clay, on his 2007 album Walk a Mile in My Shoes
Kentucky Headhunters, on their 2011 album Midnight Special
Lake Street Dive, as part of a 2020 Ad Council campaign encouraging a more welcoming nation

Notes

External links
 

1969 songs
1969 singles
Elvis Presley songs
Songs written by Joe South
Joe South songs
Songs against racism and xenophobia
Capitol Records singles